AMPPS is a solution stack of Apache, MySQL, MongoDB, PHP, Perl and Python for Windows NT, Linux and macOS. It comes with 419 PHP web applications, over 1000 PHP classes and 6 versions of PHP. AMPPS is created by Softaculous Ltd. a company founded in 2009 which makes the Softaculous Auto installer. AMPPS is used to develop on PHP, MySQL applications like WordPress, Joomla, and Drupal.

Software list

Prestashop
Concrete5
Coppermine Photo Gallery
phpBB
SMF
DokuWiki
Drupal
eZ Publish
Joomla
Geeklog
Liferay
WAMP
MAMP
Magento
Mantis Bug Tracker
MediaWiki
Moodle
Pootle
Limesurvey
Redmine
Subversion
SugarCRM
Trac
WordPress
MyBB
Xoops
b2evolution

The software has 419 PHP applications.

See also

 List of installation software

References

External links

Installation software
Free package management systems
WAMP